The Elk Falls Pratt Truss Bridge, near Elk Falls, Kansas, spans the Elk River at the east end of Montgomery St.  It was built in 1892 and was listed on the National Register of Historic Places in 1994.

It is a Pratt truss bridge built by the George E. King Bridge Co.  The bridge was taken out of service in the 1970s and, in 1992, was in the process of some restoration.  It was open for pedestrian use.

References

Truss bridges
Bridges on the National Register of Historic Places in Kansas
National Register of Historic Places in Elk County, Kansas
Infrastructure completed in 1892